Rise is a single released by Eddie Amador. It was most successful in the United Kingdom where it peaked at #19 in the singles charts and #1 in the Dance Charts during January 2000.

Charts

References

2000 songs
2000 singles